The 1999 Japan Open Tennis Championships women's singles was the women's singles event of the twenty-fifth edition of the Japan Open; a WTA Tier III tournament held in Tokyo, Japan. Ai Sugiyama was the defending champion but lost in the final 6–2, 6–2 against Amy Frazier.

Seeds

Draw

Finals

Top half

Bottom half

Qualifying

Seeds

Qualifiers

Lucky losers
  Wynne Prakusya

Qualifying draw

First qualifier

Second qualifier

Third qualifier

Fourth qualifier

References

Singles